Richard Kellaw or Richard de Kellawe (died 1316) was an English Benedictine monk and Bishop of Durham. He was elected on 31 March 1311, and was consecrated on 30 May 1311. He died on 9 October 1316. In the 19th century, a grave identified as his was excavated in the Durham Cathedral Chapter House.

Citations

References

 
 

Bishops of Durham
14th-century English Roman Catholic bishops
1316 deaths
Year of birth unknown
English Benedictines